Symplocos ophirensis is a tree in the family Symplocaceae, native to tropical Asia. It is named for Mount Ophir (now Mount Ledang) in Peninsular Malaysia.

Description
The smooth bark may be grey or brown. The inflorescences feature racemes or spikes, each of up to ten yellow to white flowers.

Distribution and habitat
Symplocos ophirensis is native to Peninsular Malaysia, Sumatra, Borneo, the Philippines and Sulawesi.

Infraspecifics
A number of subspecies and varieties of Symplocos ophirensis are recognised:
Symplocos ophirensis subsp. cumingiana 
Symplocos ophirensis var. densireticulata 
Symplocos ophirensis var. kaliensis 
Symplocos ophirensis var. lingaensis 
Symplocos ophirensis subsp. ophirensis
Symplocos ophirensis var. pachyphylla 
Symplocos ophirensis subsp. perakensis 
Symplocos ophirensis var. sumatrana

References

ophirensis
Flora of Peninsular Malaysia
Flora of Sumatra
Flora of Borneo
Flora of the Philippines
Flora of Sulawesi
Plants described in 1882
Taxa named by Charles Baron Clarke